Hénin-Beaumont is a commune in the Pas-de-Calais department in the Hauts-de-France region of France.

Geography

The A21 autoroute passes through the northern part of the commune.

History
The commune came into existence in 1971, the result of a merger of the communes of Hénin-Liétard and Beaumont.

Hénin-Beaumont has been populated since before the arrival of the Romans, attested by excavations in the 19th century, where coins and other remains were found. In 880, the town was the victim of the Norman invasion.

The town's name has changed over the centuries. From around the year 950, there are various documents listing it as Hennium, Henninium or Heninium and later as St Martinus Henain. In 1274 it appeared for the first time under the name Hanin-le-Liétard, after the seigneur, either in recognition of services rendered to the city for its fortifications, or simply to distinguish it from the nearby commune of Hénin-on-Cojeul.

In 1852, the discovery of coal deposits in the Pas-de-Calais brought Hénin-Liétard into the industrial age. From around 1856, many foreign workers came to Henin-Liétard to work in the mines. The railway came to the town at around the same time, in 1859.

During World War I, the German occupation was harsh and destructive. On the night of 3/4 October 1914, the invaders looted and ransacked the town. In April 1917, the town suffered almost total destruction as the Allies dislodged the Germans, who blew up the church of Saint-Martin before leaving the city.  After the signing of the armistice, the original inhabitants returned on 2 December 1918.
The town hall was rebuilt in 1925. In 1928, La Compagnie des Mines de Dourges built the church of Sainte-Marie for the miners. The church of Saint-Martin was rebuilt in Greco-Byzantine style by the architect Boutterin in 1932. The new railway station was opened in 1933.

At the end of the Second World War Hénin-Beaumont was liberated by the Allies, in September 1944.

Politics
In the 2009 election to replace the incumbent Socialist mayor who had resigned after a corruption scandal, the National Front took first place in the first round with 39% of the vote. A left-wing list was second with 20% of the vote. This led all other parties including the center-right Union for a Popular Movement to support the list led by the independent left-wing candidate, Daniel Duquenne in the second round runoff. Duquenne won the race 52%-48%.

In the first round of the 2012 presidential election, Marine Le Pen won in Hénin-Beaumont, with 35% of the vote, ahead of François Hollande (27%) and Nicolas Sarkozy (16%).

In 2014, the far right Front National won control of the city outright. FN politician Steeve Briois was elected mayor with 50.3 percent of the vote.

The town has been noted for its political control swinging from socialist to far-right.

Population

Places of interest
 Vestiges of an old castle.
 The churches of St.Martin and St.Marie, both dating from the twentieth century.
 The war memorial.
 The Commonwealth War Graves Commission cemetery.

International relations

Hénin-Beaumont is twinned with:

 Konin, Poland
 Herne, Germany
 Wakefield, England, United Kingdom
 Rufisque, Senegal
 Rolling Meadows, United States

See also
Communes of the Pas-de-Calais department

References

External links

 Hénin-Beaumont website 
 Communauté d'agglomération d'Henin Carvin website 
 The CWGC graves in the communal cemetery

Communes of Pas-de-Calais
Artois